Tuatha de Danann is a Brazilian Celtic metal band formed in 1995 in Varginha, Minas Gerais; known for the merry Celtic dance rhythms, flute melodies, Celtic mythology-inspired lyrics and the original jesting tones such as gnome-choirs, etc. The band is named after the race of supernaturally-gifted people in Irish mythology, the Tuatha Dé Danann, roughly translated to "People of Dana".

Between July and August 2005, Tuatha de Danann did their first tour outside Brazil, performing in France and Germany. In France, the band played shows in Saint Brieuc, Languidic, Brest, Hennebont, Tours, Grenoble, and Rheims, while in Germany the band played at the Wacken Open Air festival.

Following a hiatus, the band returned in 2013 at the Roça 'n' Roll festival organized by frontman Bruno Maia; during the occasion they performed with Martin Walkyier (ex-Sabbat, ex-Skyclad.

In 2015, they released their first album since 2004's Trova di Danú: Dawn of the New Sun. In the period between both efforts, two groups spun off Tuatha de Danann: Kemunna and Tray of Gift. Maia also released a solo album, Braia.

In 2019, they released In Nomine Élreann, containing 11 songs, nine of which are traditional Irish songs. One of the original songs, "King", was perceived as criticizing Brazil's president Jair Bolsonaro.

Discography

Studio albums 
 Tuatha de Danann (1999)
 Tingaralatingadun (2001)
 The Delirium Has Just Began... (2002)
 Trova di Danú (2004)
 Dawn of a New Sun (2015)
 The Tribes of Witching Souls (2019)
 In Nomine Éireann (2020)

Live albums/DVDs 
 Acoustic Live (2009 – Acoustic DVD)

Demos 
 The Last Pendragon (1996, demo released under the name Pendragon)
 Faeryage (1998, demo)

Singles 
 "Dawn of a New Sun" (2014)

Line-up

Current members
 Bruno Maia – lead vocals, guitars, flute, whistle, mandolin, bodhrán (1994–2010, 2013–present), 
 Giovani Gomes – bass, harsh vocals (1999–2010, 2013–present)
 Edgard Britto – keyboards (2003–2010, 2013–present)

Former members
 Rogério Vilela – bass (1995–1999)
 Wilson Melkor – drums (1995–2000)
 Felipe Batiston – keyboards (1995–2000)
 Marcos Ulisses – vocals (1998–1999)
 Leonardo Godtfriedt – keyboards, violin (2000–2002)
 Rafael Castro – keyboards, piano (2002–2003)
 Rodrigo Berne - lead guitar (1994 -2010, 2013-2017 )
 Alex Navar - uilleann pipes ( 2013- 2018)
 Rodrigo Abreu – drums, percussion (2000–2010, 2013–2018)

Touring/session members 
 Rafael Wagner – guitar
 Alex Navar – bagpipe
 Nathan Viana – violin
 Rafael Delfino – drums

References

External links
 Official Facebook
 Official Myspace
 Official YouTube channel

Celtic metal musical groups
Brazilian folk metal musical groups
Musical groups established in 1995
1995 establishments in Brazil
Musical groups disestablished in 2012
2012 disestablishments in Brazil
Musical groups reestablished in 2013
2013 establishments in Brazil